Arcos de la Frontera is a town and municipality in the Sierra de Cádiz comarca, province of Cádiz, in Andalusia, Spain. It is located on the northern, western and southern banks of the Guadalete river, which flows around three sides of the city under towering vertical cliffs, to Jerez and on to the Bay of Cádiz. The town commands a fine vista atop a sandstone ridge, from which the peak of San Cristóbal and the Guadalete Valley can be seen. The town gained its name by being the frontier of Spain's 13th-century battle with the Moors.

History

There is local evidence that Stone Age cave-dwellers used rocks to form living chambers. Roman ruins also exist in the area.

Arcos became an independent Moorish taifa in 1011 during the protracted collapse of the Umayyad Caliphate of Córdoba. Arcos was associated with the Jerez by 'Abdun ibn Muhammad who ruled from c. 1029/1030 to 1053. The region was overtaken by the Almoravid dynasty in 1091. From 1145 to 1147 the region of Arcos and Jerez was briefly a taifa under dependency of Granada, led by Abu'l-Qasim Ahyal.

The town was a bulwark of Christianity after king Alfonso X of Castile 'the Wise' (1252–1284) expelled the Moors. He constructed a Gothic cathedral which remains on its high ridge.

It is famed for its ten bells, which tolled throughout the war with the Moors. Several Moorish banners were taken in the nearby battle of Zahara and have been on display in a church in Arcos since 1483.

Main sights

 Castillo de Arcos (11th-15th-century castle), a medieval castle of Moorish origin, rebuilt almost entirely in the first half of the 15th century. Currently it is private property, not open to the public. It has a quadrangular plan with four towers at the corners. It was a military alcázar in the Muslim period. On the outside, the shields of the Dukes of Arcos are observed.
 Iglesia de la Caridad (church built between the 16th and 17th centuries)
 Basílica Menor de Santa María de la Asunción, erected after the Reconquista on a Visigothic temple and the remains of a 13th and 14th century mosque. The main facade is of Plateresque-Gothic style and the facade that faces Plaza del Cabildo is mostly Renaissance. Its unfinished tower, repaired after the 1755 Lisbon earthquake, has a Baroque air. Since 1931 it has been an Artistic-Historic Monument.

 Iglesia de San Pedro is a 15th-17th century church built on the site of a 14th-century Al-Andalusian fortress or watchtower. Different styles: Gothic, Renaissance and Baroque, can be observed in its tower and facade.
 Iglesia de San Agustín, founded in 1539 as Convento de San Juan de Letrán. It was subsequently occupied by the convent the Order of St. Augustine of the Observance. With the Confiscation the last Augustinians were expelled and the convent was abandoned. Today, the church remains.
 Iglesia de San Miguel, formerly a Moorish fortress, in the 15th century was converted into a hermitage, and was rebuilt in the 18th century. It was also a hospice for orphaned girls. Currently it is used for exhibitions and lectures.
 Iglesia de San Francisco (church built between the 16th and 17th centuries)
 Convento de la Encarnación, a convent founded in the first half of the 16th century. Its main portal is Plateresque and the adjacent one is of late-Gothic style. Currently it is a parish hall.
 Capilla de la Misericordia, a chapel founded in 1490 to house the abandoned children, and to serve as a house and hospital for women. Its facade is Gothic. It is now a conference and exhibition hall.
 Convento de las Mercedarias Descalzas, the only remaining cloistered convent in Arcos, dating from 1642. Its nuns make sweets sold there and in some candy shops in Arcos. Formerly the nuns mended every type of clothing, except men's pants.
 Hospital de San Juan de Dios, a 16th-century hospital, formerly called Hospital de San Sebastián, attached to a hermitage. There were at that time 14 charitable hospitals in Arcos, and reunified in 1596 in San Sebastián.
 Palacio de los Condes del Águila, a 15th-century late Gothic-Mudéjar palace.

 Palacio del Mayorazgo, an Herrerian style house-palace built in the 17th century. It is now a municipal building.
 Asilo de la Caridad, late-16th century.
 Edificio del Pósito (granary building) with a stone facade of 1738; it was a wheat store in the 18th century, whence its takes its name. Years later it was a public school. Today it is a health center.
 Birth house of the poet Julio Mariscal, on whose facade can seen a commemorative azulejo.
 Ayuntamiento viejo, (former City Hall), with a 17th-century stone portal. The City Council moved to the building that is in front to the castle due to stones falling from the promontory.
 The Historic center, declared a Historic-Artistic Monument in 1962.
 Remains of the Roman and Moorish City walls, although very ruined and largely demolished. This walled enclosure comprises only the upper neighborhood of the city. The remains of these walls, which can still be recognized on the ground itself, have a detailed description of by Miguel Mancheño y Olivares in his book "Apuntes para una historia de Arcos de la Frontera (chapt. V)". Of these walls, the part between the Torre de la Esquina and San Anton have little foundation remaining, and those of the City Gates Puerta de Jerez and Puerta de Carmona have completely disappeared. The city gate Puerta de Matrera is preserved, although modified.

Other places of interest
 Calle Nueva, a main street because it was the castle moat. With the 1755 Lisbon earthquake a stretch of wall collapsed, blocking the moat and giving rise to this street. It is decorated with pots, and the old small 'Bar Alcaraván' is located within a cave.
 A Roman altar, located in the alley Callejón de las Monjas.
 The Guardacantones, a common feature in streets of this town, is a reinforcement of the corners with old columns in which there are capitals of many periods.
 Alley Callejón de las Monjas'. The flying buttresses crossing this alley were built in 1699, to hold the walls of the church that began to bend under the weight of the vaults. These buttresses join Santa María and the Convento de la Encarnación.
 Plaza del Cabildo, a main square, one of whose sides is occupied by the lateral facade of Santa María, with its tower; the other side is occupied by the Parador, another side the Castillo Ducal (Ducal Castle) and the other side is the famous "Mirador de la Peña" (a viewpoint) overlooking the whole area of countryside and orchards. In this square is also a car-parking space occupying most part of the square.
 Plaza Botica, a square where diners can eat outside. The Convento de las Mercedarias Descalzas and the Convento de los Jesuitas are located here.
 Convento de los Jesuitas (Convent of the Jesuits), whose building began in 1759 but was stopped a few years later because of their expulsion from Spain; thus it is unfinished. Currently it hosts a supply market.
 Calle Maldonado, one of the town's most painted streets by artists.
 Calle Cuna, a narrow street so named because it was the entrance to a shelter for foundling children. A reproduction of this street is located in the Poble Espanyol of Barcelona.
 Calle Bóvedas, another typical street of Arcos. Here the slopes are no longer upward and begin to descend the hill of the promontory.
 Typical sights in Arcos are the so-called ventanas con orejeras (windows with earmuffs), holes in the sides of the window, in various styles, to observe from inside what happens outside.
 Plaza de Toros de Arcos de la Frontera, a bullring.
 The Oficina de Turismo y el Centro de Interpretación de la Ciudad de Arcos (the Tourist Office and Interpretation Center of the City of Arcos), located in a typical old house.

Cortijos, haciendas and mills
The cortijos are traditional big farmhouses. Mostly are old, and currently many serve as hotels. This list also includes haciendas and mills.
Cortijo de San Rafael
Cortijo de la Fuensanta
Cortijo Casablanca
Cortijo Casa Blanquilla
Cortijo Albardén
Cortijo del Rey
Cortijo el Jadublón
Cortijo Barranco
Cortijo Faín
Cortijo las Posadas
Cortijo Nuevo or el Guijo
Cortijo or Hacienda el Peral
Cortijo Soto del Almirante
Hacienda el Santiscal
Hacienda de San Andrés Nuevo
Molino del Bachiller Viejo, (mill).
Molino Nuestra Señora de la Luz or Barrancos, (mill).
Molino de San Antón, (mill).

Former monuments
In Cuesta of Belén, in the entrance to the historic center, was one of the three city gates in medieval times, called Puerta de Jerez, which was torn down in 1852. An architect built a replica on his own initiative. This is the only replica of old monuments in Arcos.

Natural sites
The cliffs, and the promontory called "la Peña".
The Guadalete river, and reservoir.

Gastronomy
Native cuisine: Sausages. Ajo a la molinera. Sopa de Clausura. Gazpacho serrano. Sopa de espárragos. Sopa de tomate. Berza (chickpea stew). Garbanzos con tomillo. Revueltos de espárragos, Alboronía, Abajao, Poleá. Dishes cooked with game meat, pork and lamb.
Sweets: Bollos de Semana Santa. Pestiños. Empanadillas. Compota regada con miel serrana. Also sweets made by nuns of Convento de las Mercedarias Descalzas.

Besides the Bar Alcaraván, there is also, in the historic center, bars for tapas like 'Bar la Cárcel', 'Mesón La Rebotica', 'Mesón Los Murales', 'Casa Rural la Campana'. There also an Italian food restaurant the 'Mamma Tina'.

 Fiestas 
 Festividad de Nuestra Señora de las Nieves (Feast of Our Lady of the Snows -town's Patron Saint-)
 Semana Santa de Arcos (Holy Week of Arcos), declared a National Tourist Interest, every April.
 Toro del Aleluya (Bull of the Hallelujah), a running of the bulls based. Every Easter Sunday. First held in 1784.
 Zambombas of Arcos, declared of Intangible Cultural interest.
 Día del Caballo (Day of the Horse)
 Carnaval de Arcos (Carnival of Arcos), every second week of February.
 Cruz de Mayo (May Cross), in 2016 was held on April 30 and May 1.
 Velada del Barrio Bajo (Night fair of the Bajo neighbourhood), every May.
 Feria y Fiestas de San Miguel Patrón de Arcos (Fair and Festivals of Archangel Saint Michael Patron of Arcos)
 Belén Viviente (Living Bethlehem), declared of Tourist Interest of Andalusia.
 Romería del Santísimo Cristo del Romeral (Pilgrimage of the Holy Christ of El Romeral''), every September.

Other towns within the municipality

 La Perdiz
 Los Barrancos
 El Santiscal
 Concejo
 El Drago
 Descansadero del Drago
 La Pedrosa
 Fuensanta
 La Garrapata
 Jadramil
 El Güijo
 Junta de los Ríos
 La Misericordia
 Jédula
 La Sierpe
 Las Abiertas
 Toronjil
 El Yugo
 Pequeña Holanda
 Vallejas

Notes

References
 M. Mancheño y Olivares, Galeria de Arcobricenses illustres (Arcos, 1892)
 M. Mancheño y Olivares, Riqueza y cultura de Arcos de la Frontera (Arcos, 1898)

External links 

 City Hall of Arcos de la Frontera 
 Arcos on the Net - citizen and tourist information about Arcos de la Frontera 
 Arcos de la Frontera in Twitter. 
 Satellite image from Google Local
  Jerez de la Frontera Airport
  Walking tour of Arcos de la Frontera

Municipalities of the Province of Cádiz
Roman sites in Spain